Madhupal Kannambathu is an Indian actor, director, and screenwriter who works in Malayalam cinema. Madhupal made his acting debut with Kashmeeram in 1994 and his directorial debut with Thalappavu (2008), which was about Naxal Varghese and won several awards in 2008.

Biography

Madhupal is a native of Kozhikode and took post graduation in commerce. His association with cinema dates back to when he was a child in Palakkad. His father, Chengalath Madhava Menon, ran a movie theatre.  Madhupal is also a short story writer in Malayalam. He has acted in more than 90 films in Malayalam, Tamil, English and Hindi, including lead roles. His short stories have been translated into English, Hindi, and Tamil, and have appeared in publications like Mathrubhumi, Madhyamam, and Bhashaposhini magazines. He started his career in film as an assistant director to eminent film makers like Bharath Gopi and Rajiv Anchal. Madhupal assisted Rajiv Anchal in Butterflies, Kashmeeram, Guru (which won national awards and was the only entry to the Academy Awards from India in the year 1997), Made in USA (which had R. Madhavan in the lead), Nothing But Life (English, shot in Las Vegas) and the eminent actor Bharath Gopi in the film Yamanam (which won a National Award in 1991). He turned actor in Kashmeeram. It was a negative role and more of such roles came his way after that. He won the Critic's Award for Best Debutante Actor for his role in the film Kashmeeram and the Second Best Actor for his role of Hari in the series on MT Kathakal, called Kazhcha, telecast on Amritha TV. He assisted Jude Attipetty in the direction of Shararandal, a 13-part serial, written by National Award-winning writer P. F. Mathews.  He also wrote the screenplay and dialogue for the Malayalam movie Bharatheeyam, which was released in 1997. Films he has acted in include Kashmeeram (1994), Soosanna, Agnisakshi, Guru, Made in USA, Rishivamsam, Vardhakyapuraanam, Ravanaprabhu, Twenty-Twenty, Freekick (Hindi), Nothing but Life (English), and Oru naal Oru Kanavu (Tamil). His first directorial venture was for television (Akaasaththile Paravakal, telecast on Kairali Channel). Thalappavu was his big screen directorial debut; the film received the Kerala State Best Debutante Director Award and various other awards. Madhupal has ventured more and more into the world of letters and has published seven collections of short stories. He became engaged in several projects to help those affected by the 2004 Indian Ocean earthquake; he is associated with Santhigiri Ashram, Thiruvananthapuram as Assistant General Convener Advisory Committee. He is a former Member of Kerala Chalachithra Academy (the organizers of IFFK), Member of Kerala Folklore Academy (Kerala state Govt. organisation) and Kerala Children's Film Society (Kerala state government organisation). His second film, Ozhimuri (A Document of Separation), was selected for Indian Panorama 2012 and the International Film Festival of Kerala 2012. Ozhimuri won the Kerala State Second Best Movie Award.

Madhupal is a member of the board of directors of the Kerala State Film Development Corporation (KSFDC).

Now Madhupal is appointed as the Chairman of The Kerala State Cultural Activists Welfare Fund Board

Personal life
Madhupal is married to Rekha. He has two daughters, Madhavi and Meenakshi. His father, Chengalath Madhava Menon, was from Kannur, and his mother, Kannambath Rugmani Amma, is a native of Kozhikode. He is the eldest child of his parents, followed by three brothers and a sister. He now lives in Thiruvananthapuram with his family.

Awards and recognitions
 Kerala State Television Awards 2018 for Best Director (Kaligandaki)
 Kerala State Government Film Award for Second Best Film of the Year 2012 (Ozhimuri)
 Best Film 2012 Pearl Award Qatar Kerala Film Producers (Ozhimuri)
 Best Director Award Jaihind Television 2012 (Ozhimuri)
 Best Director Award Doordharsan Nirav (Ozhimuri)
 Second Best Film Kerala Film Critics Award 2012 (Ozhimuri)
 Best Actor Special Jury National Award Government of India to Lal (Ozhimuri)
 Director of Excellence Award from Indonesia Film Festival 2013 film (Ozhimuri)
 Kerala State Government Television Awards for Best Director 2012 (Daivaththinu Swantham Devootty)
 Kerala State Film Award for Best Debut Director Kerala State Government (Thalappavu)
 Best Director 2008 Kerala Film Critics Award 2008 (Thalappavu)
 Best Director 2008 Sohan Antony Memorial Award 2008 (Thalappavu)
 Best Debut Director 2008 Jesy Foundation Award (Thalappavu)
 Best Debut Director 2008 ALA Award (Thalappavu)
 Best Director 2001 TV Serial Aakaasaththile Paravakal Kerala Film Critics Award
 Best Director 2001 TV Serial Malayalam Television Viewers Association Award

AWARDS  FOR PUBLISHED  BOOKS
 Kairaly Atlas Saahithya Award 2006 for the story "Velicham Nizhanlinu Velippedum" (published in Bhaashaaposhini)
 Vaikom Muhamed Basheer Puraskaram 2019 to the book 'KATHA' 2019 published by Sahithya pravarthaka sahakaranasamgham NBS Kottayam
 INDIAN TRUTH SAHITHYA PURASKARAM 2019 to the book 'KATHA' Published by NBS Kottayam

Filmography

As an actor

 In (2022)
 The Priest (2021)
 Kaalchilambu (2021)
  Paapam cheyyaaththavar kalleriyatte (2020)
  Oru Kuprasidha payyan  (2018)
 IDI (2016)
 White Paper (2016)
 Anarkali (2015)
 Saigal Padukayanu (2015)
 Perithondhan (2015)
 Haram (2015) Dr. John
 Saradhi (2015) JP 
 To Noora With Love (2014) 
 Memories (2013) Dr. Sukumaran Nair
 Radio Jockey (2013)
 Teens (2013)
 Tourist Home (2013) Mammotty
 Aakasmikam (2012)
 Little Master  (2012)
 Red Alert (2012)
 Marching Ahead (2013)
 Athe Mazha Athe Veyil (2011)
 Nakharam (2010)
 Kadaksham (2010)
 Aayirathil Oruvan (2009)
 Parayan Marannathu (2009)
 Twenty-Twenty (2008) Sekharankutty
 Kovalam (2008) Ali Khan
 Nadhiya Kollappetta Raathri (2007) Dr. Ajayaghosh
 Sooryan (2007) Divakaran
 Paradeshi (2007) Adv. Pradeep
 Detective (2007) Jose
 Valmeekam  (2007)
 Vaasthavam (2006) Joseph
 Chess (2006) Adv. Mathews
 Lion (2006)
 Prajapathi (2006) 
 Pathaka (2006) Pratheesh Nambiar
 Eakantham(2006) Vishwanathan
 Lessons (2005) Father
 Five Fingers (2005)
 Oru Naal Oru Kanavu (2005) Sekhar Tamil
 Made in USA (2005) Johny
 Deepangal Sakshi (2005)
 Isra (2005) Balu
 Nothing But Life (2004) Johny 
 Wanted (2004)
 Thalamelam (2004)
 Maratha Naadu (2004) Majeed
 Manassinakkare (2003) Benny Kompanakkaattil
 Margam (2003)
 Valathottu Thirinjal Nalamathe Veedu (2003) Suresh
 Ammakilikkoodu (2003)
 Saphalam (2003) Antony
 Achante Kochumolku (2003) Chandu
 Stop Violence (2002) Antony
 Chirikkudukka (2002) Nandakumar
 Kanmashi (2002)
 Desam (2002) Vijayakrishnan
 Kanal Kireedam (2002)
 Kayamkulam Kanaran (2002)
 Ee naadu Inale Vare (2001)
 Ravanaprabhu (2001) Hari Narayanan
 Nalacharitham Nalam Divasam (2001)
 Chandanamarangal (2001)
 Goa (2001) Simon
 Dada Sahib (2000) Ravi
 Mark Antony (2000)
 Susanna (2000) Rameshan
 Pilots (2000)
 Vinayapoorvam Vidyadharan (2000)
 Mister Butler (2000)
 Ival Dhroupathi (2000) Ameer Khan
 Aakasha Ganga (1999) Devan Varma
 Agni Sakshi (1999)
 Deepasthambham Mahaschyaram (1999)
 Captain (1999) David
 Rishivamsham (1999)
 Stalin Sivadas (1999) Sukumaran
 Pallavoor Devanarayanan (1999)
 Samantharangal (1998)
 Sooryavanam (1998)
 Mailpeelikkavu (1998)
 Aaghosham (1998)
 Bharatheeyam (1998)
 Guru (1997)
 Asuravamsam (1997)
 Kilukil Pambaram (1997)
 Snehadoothu (1997) Mahendran
 Excuse Me Ethu Collegila (1996)
 Swapna Lokathe Balabhaskaran (1996)
 Ammuvinte Aangalamar (1996)
 Pallivathuckal Thommichan (1996)
 Sathyabhaamaykkoru Pranayalekhanam (1996) Indrajith
 Kaathil Oru Kinnaram (1996) Ajith
 Mayoora Nritham (1996)
 Azhakiya Ravanan (1996) Cameo
 Kanchanam (1996)
 Ishtamanu Nooruvattom (1996)
 Mr. Clean (1996) Harikrishnan
 Oru Abhibhashakante Case Diary (1995) Reji
 Arabia (1995)
 Saadaram (1995) Nazar
 Sreeragam (1995)
 Thacholi Varghese Chekavar (1995) Venu
 Manthrikam (1995)
 Ezharakoottam (1995)
 Vardhakya Puranam (1994) Vysaakhan
 Kashmeeram (1994)

As a dubbing artist
 Aakasha Ganga (1999) for Riyaz as Unnikrishna Varma Thampuran

As a director

Published works
 Ee Jeevitham Jeevichu Theerkkunnathu
 Hebrewil Oru Premalekhanam
 Jainimettile Pashukkal (co-authored with Joseph Marien)
 Pranayinikalude Uthyaanavum Kumbasaarakoodum
 Kadal Oru Nathiyude Kathhayaanu
 Madhupaalinte Kathhakal (2010, published by Mathrubhumi Books)
 Facebook (novel) (2012, published by Mathrubhumi Books)
 Vaakkukal Kelkkaan Oru Kaalam Varum - Memories (2015, published by Green Pepper Books)
 Avan (Maar) Jaaraputhran (short story collection, 2016, published by DC Books Kottayam, Second edition published by Mathrubhumi books 2020)
  "Katha" 2019 published by  -    Sahithya Pravarthaka Sahakaranasamgham NBS Kottayam
  "Pallaand Vaazhka My Micro Kathakal" 2021 (published by Paper Publica Thiruvananthapuram)
  "Athbuthangal kaanum jeevithaththil" short stories 2022 (published by Macbeth publication, Calicut)

Television serials
 As actor
Pavitra Jaililanu (Asianet)
Dream City (Surya TV)
Sree Mahabhagavatham (Asianet)
Rachiyamma (Dooradarshan)
Niramala (Dooradarshan)
Deivathinte Swantham Devootty (Mazhavil Manorama)
Kali Gandaki (Amrita TV)
CBI Diary (Mazhavil Manorama)
 As director
Aakasaththile Paravakal (Kairali)
Deivathinte Swantham Devootty (Mazhavil Manorama)
Kali Gandaki (Amrita TV)
Jeevithanizhalpaadukal Vaikomk Muhammed Basheer's novel for PRD Kerala State
 M K Sanoo A documentary  for PRD Kerala State

Other works
He acts as a judge on the popular reality show Yuvatharam, telecast on Jaihind TV.

References

External links

 
 Madhupal at MSI
 'Cinema of Malayalam' profile
 A new chapter

Living people
Male actors from Palakkad
Malayalam-language writers
Malayalam short story writers
Male actors in Malayalam cinema
Indian male film actors
Malayalam film directors
Writers from Palakkad
20th-century Indian dramatists and playwrights
21st-century Indian short story writers
Indian male screenwriters
Indian male short story writers
21st-century Indian film directors
20th-century Indian male actors
21st-century Indian male actors
21st-century Indian dramatists and playwrights
Film directors from Kerala
20th-century Indian male writers
21st-century Indian male writers
1961 births